This is a list of events in British radio during 1999.

Events
BBC Radio Wales begins to appear on FM in the major conurbations for the first time. Previously, apart from in Gwent, the station had only been available on MW with the allocated block of FM frequencies for local broadcasting in Wales, which was only available in parts of the country, used by BBC Radio Cymru as BBC management had concluded that BBC Radio Cymru would not have enough listeners to merit nationwide coverage on a medium wave frequency.

January
3 January – On BBC Radio 2, David Jacobs introduces Frank Sinatra: A Man and His Music, a one-hour television concert recorded in the 1960s.
22 January – Church leaders condemn Birmingham-based station BRMB's "Two Strangers and a Wedding" competition in which contestants entered a competition to marry a complete stranger. The winners, Greg Cordell and Carla Germaine are married at a Registry Office in the city, but the couple are separated three months later. Germaine later meets and marries BRMB disc jockey Jeremy Kyle.
January –
Choice FM is taken over by the Chrysalis Group, which later renames it Choice FM Birmingham Galaxy 102.2.
London's dance/urban station Kiss 100 is rebranded by EMAP Radio with a new logo. The station introduces a more mainstream pop-orientated playlist which leads to criticism from some DJs and listeners.

February
No events.

March
No events.

April 
9 April – Roger Bolton presents his first edition of Feedback on BBC Radio 4. He would continue to host it until 2022.
26 April – Radio 2 presenter Johnnie Walker is suspended from his drivetime show after allegations concerning a drug problem appeared in the Sunday tabloid, the News of the World. Walker has been the victim of a tabloid exposé over his cocaine problem. Richard Allinson presents the drivetime show during Walker's absence, while Tom Robinson stands in on his Saturday afternoon show.
April – Radio Regen is launched in Manchester to provide training in community radio. It broadcasts a two-month-long temporary radio station called City Centre Life 87.7.

May
24 May – Radio 2 says that presenter Sarah Kennedy is taking a week's holiday because of stress following a bizarre performance while standing in for Terry Wogan the previous Friday. This had included calling Ken Bruce an "old fool" and referring to the presenter of the day's Pause For Thought slot as "an old prune". The episode attracted a number of concerned calls to the BBC, while Kennedy blames the incident on a lack of sleep the previous night and apologises to listeners. She had been due to stand in for Wogan the following week, but takes time off instead.

June
June – Launch of Sky News Radio, a service providing bespoke bulletins for Talk Radio.
18 June – Des Lynam presents his last Friday evening show on Radio 2.

July
2 July – Ed Stewart presents his final weekday afternoon show on BBC Radio 2 as he moves to weekends.
3 July – Jonathan Ross joins BBC Radio 2 to present a Saturday morning show.
5 July – Steve Wright in the Afternoon returns to radio after a break of six years as Steve Wright replaces Ed Stewart as Radio 2's weekday afternoon presenter.

August
2 August – It is announced that ITV has signed BBC sports presenter Des Lynam on a four-year contract to become the company's main football presenter. Consequently, he will no longer present his Friday drivetime show on Radio 2.
19 August – BBC Radio 1 broadcasts its first split programming when it introduces weekly national new music shows for Scotland, Wales and Northern Ireland. One of the new presenters is Huw Stephens joins the station and Bethan Elfyn also joins.

September
11 September – BBC Radio 3's breakfast programme On Air is renamed Morning on 3.
13 September – Late Junction is broadcast on BBC Radio 3 for the first time.
19 September – 
The first edition of a new Sunday evening advice programme called The Surgery is broadcast on BBC Radio 1 and Sara Cox joins.
Thirteen years after Radio Victory had stopped broadcasting, Victory FM starts broadcasting to the Portsmouth area on a permanent basis, after six 28-day RSL FM broadcasts which took place between 1994 to 1998. Within weeks, the station is acquired by TLRC.

October
14 October – Managers at BBC Radio 2 reinstate Johnnie Walker after he is fined £2,000 by magistrates for admitting possession of cocaine, he will return to the airwaves 6 December.

November
15 November – Britain's first national commercial DAB digital radio multiplex, Digital One, goes on air to England, and parts of Scotland and Wales – D1 did not become available in Northern Ireland until 2013. The stations carried on D1 at launch include the three national commercial AM/FM services – Classic FM, Virgin Radio (now Absolute) and Talk Radio UK (now talkSPORT) – along with two new digital-first stations – fresh pop service Core and classic rock station Planet Rock, both then under the ownership of Classic FM's then parent (and Digital One shareholder) GWR Group.

December
5 December – Despite having been banned by many radio stations, and panned by critics, Cliff Richard's single The Millennium Prayer – which features Richard singing the words of the Lord's Prayer to the tune of "Auld Lang Syne" – reaches number one in the UK charts.
6 December – Johnnie Walker returns to BBC Radio 2 after being suspended.
 17 December – Britain's first million pounds prize is given away, on a segment of Chris Evans's Virgin breakfast show called Someone's Going to be a Millionaire (a reference to ITV's Who Wants to Be a Millionaire?, which at the time has not had a million pound winner).

Unknown
BBC Radio 1 establishes its Live Lounge as part of the mid-morning show.
Bedford station B97 is rebranded back to its original name of Chiltern FM.

Station debuts
1 February – Mansfield 103.2
8 February – FLR 107.3
20 March – Tower FM
3 May – Telford FM
 18 June – Sky News Radio
26 June – Fire 107.6
24 July – 106.8 Lite FM
30 August – 
Wave 102
The Revolution
5 September – SouthCity FM
19 September – Victory FM
3 October – 
Fen Radio 107.5
Ridings FM
Win 107.2
7 November – Yorkshire Coast Radio Bridlington
15 November – 
Core Radio
Planet Rock
Bath FM
19 November – 
Beat 106
107 The Edge
1 December – South Hams Radio

Closing this year
22 May –  
Goldbeat (1995–1999)
Heartbeat 1521 (1996–1999)

Programme debuts
 11 February – It's Been a Bad Week on BBC Radio 2 (1999–2006)
 27 February – Heated Rollers on BBC Radio 2 (1999)
 3 July – Jonathan Ross on BBC Radio 2 (1999–2010)
 13 September – Late Junction on BBC Radio 3 (1999–present)
 12 November – The Attractive Young Rabbi on BBC Radio 4 (1999–2002)

Changes of network affiliation

Returning this year after a break of one year or longer
 5 July – Steve Wright in the Afternoon on BBC Radio 2 (1981–1993, 1999–2022)

Continuing radio programmes

1940s
 Sunday Half Hour (1940–2018)
 Desert Island Discs (1942–Present)
 Letter from America (1946–2004)
 Woman's Hour (1946–Present)
 A Book at Bedtime (1949–Present)

1950s
 The Archers (1950–Present)
 The Today Programme (1957–Present)
 Sing Something Simple (1959–2001)
 Your Hundred Best Tunes (1959–2007)

1960s
 Farming Today (1960–Present)
 In Touch (1961–Present)
 The World at One (1965–Present)
 The Official Chart (1967–Present)
 Just a Minute (1967–Present)
 The Living World (1968–Present)
 The Organist Entertains (1969–2018)

1970s
 PM (1970–Present)
 Start the Week (1970–Present)
 You and Yours (1970–Present)
 I'm Sorry I Haven't a Clue (1972–Present)
 Good Morning Scotland (1973–Present)
 Newsbeat (1973–Present)
 The News Huddlines (1975–2001)
 File on 4 (1977–Present)
 Money Box (1977–Present)
 The News Quiz (1977–Present)
 Feedback (1979–Present)
 The Food Programme (1979–Present)
 Science in Action (1979–Present)

1980s
 In Business (1983–Present)
 Sounds of the 60s (1983–Present)
 Loose Ends (1986–Present)

1990s
 The Moral Maze (1990–Present)
 Essential Selection (1991–Present)
 No Commitments (1992–2007)
 The Pepsi Chart (1993–2002)
 Wake Up to Wogan (1993–2009)
 Essential Mix (1993–Present)
 Up All Night (1994–Present)
 Wake Up to Money (1994–Present)
 Private Passions (1995–Present)
 Parkinson's Sunday Supplement (1996–2007)
 The David Jacobs Collection (1996–2013)
 Westway (1997–2005)
 The 99p Challenge (1998–2004)
 Puzzle Panel (1998–2005)
 Drivetime with Johnnie Walker (1998–2006)
 Sunday Night at 10 (1998–2013)
 In Our Time (1998–Present)
 Material World (1998–Present)
 Scott Mills (1998–Present)
 The Now Show (1998–Present)

Ending this year
 28 January – World of Pub (1998–1999)
 25 February – Blue Jam (1997–1999)
 30 March – Chambers (1996–1999)
 25 May – Julie Enfield Investigates (1994–1999)
 18 June – Des Lynam (1998–1999)
 2 July – The Ed Stewart Weekday Afternoon Show on BBC Radio 2 (1991–1999)

Deaths
 10 March – Adrian Love, 54, radio presenter
 13 March – Olive Shapley, 88, radio documentary producer and broadcaster 
 3 June – Peter Brough, 83, radio ventriloquist [sic.'']
 7 October – Deryck Guyler, 85, actor
 22 November – Ian Messiter, 79, panel game creator
 15 December – George Elrick, 95, Scottish bandleader and DJ

See also 
 1999 in British music
 1999 in British television
 1999 in the United Kingdom
 List of British films of 1999

References

Radio
British Radio, 1999 In
Years in British radio